Philip of Savoy may refer to:

 Philip I, Count of Savoy (1207–1285), Count of Savoy 1268-1285
 Philip I of Piedmont (1278–1334)
 Philip II of Piedmont (1340-1368)
 Philip of Savoy, Count of Genève (1417–1444), son of Antipope Felix V and Mary of Burgundy, Duchess of Savoy 
 Philip II, Duke of Savoy (1438-1497), Duke of Savoy 1496-1497